Hardin Valley is a suburban unincorporated community in west Knox County, Tennessee, United States.

History
Since the late 2000s, Hardin Valley has become the fastest growing area in Knox County by population. Since July 2014, over 1,200 building permits have been issued in the Hardin Valley area, most of which include subdivisions and apartment complexes. With the growing popularity of the area, many current residents have become concerned of congestion issues along roads in Hardin Valley.

The Hardin Valley area, according to the Knoxville and Knox County Metropolitan Planning Commission, has a sustained 30-year growth rate of 3.9%.

Geography
Hardin Valley is located in the westernmost portion of Knox County and is accessible by Hardin Valley Road, Yarnell Road, Lovell Road, Tennessee State Route 62 (Oak Ridge Highway), and the Pellissippi Parkway.

Demographics

According to a study performed by the Knoxville-Knox County Metropolitan Planning Commission, the population of Hardin Valley per the 2010 United States Census, was 10,450. The community has seen an increase of nearly 2,000 residents every year since 2014.

Education

Public schools
Hardin Valley is the site of several public schools operated by the Knox County Schools district. Public schools in the area include Hardin Valley Elementary, Hardin Valley Middle, and Hardin Valley Academy.

Community college
Hardin Valley is the location of the main campus for Pellissippi State Community College.

References

Unincorporated communities in Knox County, Tennessee
Unincorporated communities in Tennessee
Knoxville metropolitan area